Johannes Vennegoor of Hesselink (born 7 November 1978) is a Dutch former professional footballer. He formerly played for the Netherlands national team as a striker. He played for clubs such as the Dutch Eredivisie's FC Twente and PSV, the Scottish Premier League's Celtic, Hull City of the English Premier League and Rapid Vienna of Austria's Bundesliga.

Name
British newspaper The Guardian researched his unusual-sounding name and found that he was thus named because: ...way back in the 17th century, two farming families in the Enschede area of Holland intermarried. Both the Vennegoor and Hesselink names carried equal social weight, and so – rather than choose between them – they chose to use both. 'Of' in Dutch actually translates to 'or', which would mean that a strict translation of his name would read Jan Vennegoor or Hesselink.

Club career

Twente and PSV
Born in Oldenzaal, Vennegoor of Hesselink scored 59 league goals for FC Twente over the course of five seasons. In 2001, he was signed by Eredivisie-rivals PSV. Vennegoor of Hesselink scored 22 times for PSV during his first season with the club. His second and third seasons at PSV proved less fruitful, with eight and twelve goals, respectively. At the end of the 2003–04 season, he was told he could leave the club, but stayed on and scored 19 goals in 28 matches during the 2004–05 season. He also earned a recall to the national team in March 2005 after an absence of almost five years.

Celtic

2006–07

On 24 August 2006, Vennegoor of Hesselink left PSV and signed a three-year deal with Scottish Premier League champions Celtic, with the option of a further year, for a fee of around £3.4 million. He made his debut on 26 August against Hibernian and scored the winning goal after coming on as a substitute. In his next game against Aberdeen on 9 September, he scored the winner from outside the box in a 1–0 win. He then scored his first European goal for Celtic in the UEFA Champions League against Manchester United four days later, scoring the opening goal as United won 3–2. Injuries subsequently curtailed his appearances but he found his form late on, scoring his first hat-trick for the Bhoys against St Mirren on 20 January 2007 and a last minute winner against Inverness the following week, before being sent off with a second yellow card after leaving the field of play to celebrate with the Celtic fans. He ended the season with 18 goals to his name and SPL and Scottish Cup winners medals as well.

2007–08
Vennegoor of Hesselink started the new season well, scoring five goals in his first six league matches. After shaking off injury, he started to find some form and by January his performances improved immensely, delivering a Man of the Match performance and scoring against in a 5–1 thrashing of Kilmarnock in the Scottish Cup. He followed that up with a goal against Hearts on 16 February and then a stunning diving header against Barcelona four days later to give Celtic a 1–0 lead in the Champions League Round of 16 first-leg at Celtic Park, although Barcelona won the match 3–2. On 16 April, Vennegoor of Hesselink scored his first Old Firm goal against Rangers at Celtic Park in injury-time to give Celtic a 2–1 win. Many saw that goal as the major turning point in Celtic's incredible comeback to win the league. On 22 May, the last day of the season, he scored what proved to be the league-winning goal with a powerful header off a corner kick against Dundee United at Tannadice Park. It was Vennegoor of Hesselink's 20th goal of the season and rounded off another successful year for both player and club, as the big striker and teammate Scott McDonald struck up an extremely productive partnership, leading most strike pairings in the UK for almost the entire season, a total of 40 scored by the pair combined in the league alone and 51 in total.

2008–09
The 2008–09 season started slowly for Vennegoor of Hesselink. On 31 August, just three minutes after coming on as a substitute, he was sent off against Rangers at Celtic Park for kicking out at Rangers' Kirk Broadfoot. Rangers won the match 4–2. He scored his first goals of the season against Aberdeen in a 3–2 win at Celtic Park on 27 September, with his second being a last-minute winner. Vennegoor of Hesselink then went on a long goal drought (mainly due to the fact that he was out injured for over three months) until 4 April 2009, when he scored the final goal of Celtic's 4–0 win against Hamilton Academical with a simple tap-in. He scored again four days later in another 4–0 victory with another simple tap-in, this time the second against Falkirk. The big striker made it three goals in three games on 11 April when he scored the opening goal against Hearts at Tynecastle with less than 25 seconds on the clock. The game ended 1–1 with Bruno Aguiar scoring the equaliser for Hearts. It was then four in four when he scored a 43rd-minute opener in a 2–0 win at home to Aberdeen on 18 April. He ended the season with a League Cup winners' medal, after Celtic beat Rangers 2–0 in the final on 15 March. Although Celtic did not lose any games in which Vennegoor of Hesselink scored in the 2008–09 season, he was released at the end of his contract in July 2009.

Hull City
On 3 September 2009, Vennegoor of Hesselink signed a two-year contract with Premier League club Hull City. He made his debut for the club against Sunderland on 12 September when he came on as a substitute for Craig Fagan. He scored his first goal for the club with the opening goal in the 2–1 home win against Wigan Athletic on 3 October 2009. He also gained another winner with a last minute strike against Stoke after coming on as a substitute.

His contract with Hull City expired at the end of the 2009–10 season, and as of 1 July 2010 was confirmed as a free agent by officials at Hull City, along with fellow former Dutch national team player, George Boateng.

Rapid Vienna
On 30 August 2010, Vennegoor of Hesselink joined Rapid Vienna as a free agent on a two-year deal after his contract expired with Hull City. Vennegoor of Hesselink said on the club's official website "I received several interesting offers from European clubs. However, Rapid's offer gave me and my family the best feeling. This club and this city made it an easy decision for me to join Rapid. I'm looking forward to the next chapter in my career".

On 21 October 2010, he scored the first goal to help his side to a 2–0 away win against Bulgarian outfit CSKA Sofia in a UEFA Europa League match, snapping a two-game losing streak for the team from Vienna in the tournament in question.

Vennegoor of Hesselink did not play many games in the 2010–11 season, due to several injuries. After a muscle rupture in May, his season was therefore over. In June, Vennegoor of Hesselink and Rapid Vienna mutually agreed to terminate his contract.

Return to PSV
After his departure from Rapid Vienna, Vennegoor of Hesselink trained with the FC Twente youth team. On 4 October 2011, it was announced that Vennegoor of Hesselink had joined PSV to train with the first team squad. Early November, it was rumoured that Vennegoor of Hesselink would return to the PSV squad on a second spell. On 3 November 2011, it was confirmed that he had signed with PSV until the end of the season.

Retirement
On 15 May 2012, Vennegoor of Hesselink announced his retirement from professional football.

International career

Vennegoor of Hesselink made his international debut for the Netherlands on 11 October 2000 in Rotterdam in the Netherlands' 2–0 World Cup qualifier defeat against Portugal, but did not score his first international goal until almost seven years later, in a friendly match against Thailand on 6 June 2007. Despite his fabulous form in his first season at PSV, Vennegoor of Hesselink could not guide the Netherlands to 2002 World Cup due to being behind forwards Pierre van Hooijdonk and Ruud van Nistelrooy in the pecking order. Vennegoor of Hesselink could not replicate his domestic form for PSV in subsequent seasons, and missed out on UEFA Euro 2004. However, he was included in the Dutch squad to play at the 2006 World Cup, where he made a late appearance as a substitute in the second-round game against Portugal, and at UEFA Euro 2008, where he appeared against Romania.

Career statistics

Club

International
Scores and results list Netherlands goal tally first

Honours
Twente
KNVB Cup: 2000–01

PSV
Eredivisie: 2002–03, 2004–05, 2005–06
KNVB Cup: 2004–05, 2011–12

Celtic
Scottish Premier League: 2006–07, 2007–08
Scottish Cup: 2006–07
Scottish League Cup: 2008–09

References

External links

Jan Vennegoor of Hesselink profile  Carling

1978 births
Living people
People from Oldenzaal
Footballers from Overijssel
Dutch footballers
Netherlands international footballers
Association football forwards
FC Twente players
PSV Eindhoven players
Celtic F.C. players
Hull City A.F.C. players
SK Rapid Wien players
Eredivisie players
Scottish Premier League players
Premier League players
Austrian Football Bundesliga players
2006 FIFA World Cup players
UEFA Euro 2008 players
Dutch expatriate footballers
Expatriate footballers in Scotland
Expatriate footballers in England
Dutch expatriate sportspeople in England
Dutch expatriate sportspeople in Scotland